McMahan's Furniture was a family-owned furniture retailer with stores in California, Arizona, New Mexico, Texas, Nevada, Colorado and Oregon. Much of its business came from customers to whom it provided credit.

History 
The first store was opened in 1919 in Bakersfield, California. In 1993, Heilig-Meyers bought 92 McMahan's stores for $65 million. In 1996, Heilig-Meyers arranged to buy another 20 stores from McMahan's. Whether the 1996 sale was completed is unknown. Of the stores remaining, three were closed in 2006. The last 17 stores, including two La-Z-Boy Furniture Gallery locations (one in California and one in Oregon), were closed in 2008. A company press release cited macroeconomic conditions as the reason:

Lawsuit 
In 1975, a water main near the company's Santa Monica store burst. The company and its insurer, Aetna, sued the city under the theory of inverse condemnation. The company wanted the jury to be instructed that  but the court refused to give the instruction, and the jury awarded damages corresponding to the wholesale value. The lower court's decision was upheld on appeal. The court of appeals quoted a restatement of the law of torts saying that "damages for the profits which the wholesale dealer or the retail dealer would normally anticipate from a sale are not ordinarily allowed." The suit is considered one of "the leading cases" in California tort law about the value of inventory.

References 

Furniture retailers of the United States
Retail companies based in California
Defunct companies based in Greater Los Angeles
Defunct retail companies of the United States
Retail companies established in 1919
Retail companies disestablished in 2008
Companies based in Bakersfield, California
Companies based in Santa Monica, California
1919 establishments in California
2008 disestablishments in California